USS LST-546 was a United States Navy  in commission from 1944 to sometime between 1946 and 1952. From 1952 until 1972 she served in a non-commissioned status in the Military Sea Transportation Service and Military Sealift Command as USNS LST-546 (T-LST-546).

LST-546 was laid down on 20 December 1943 at Evansville, Indiana, by the Missouri Valley Bridge & Iron Co; launched on 16 February 1944; sponsored by Mrs. W. J. Barbrick; and commissioned on 27 March 1944.

Occupation Duty
LST-546 saw no combat action in World War II.  Following the war, LST-546 performed occupation duty in the Far East and saw service in China until early January 1946.

Decommissioning
LST-546 was decommissioned sometime between 1946 and 31 March 1952, but the exact date awaits further research.

Service as USNS LST-546
On 31 March 1952, LST-546 was transferred to the Military Sea Transportation Service, later the Military Sealift Command, where she served in a non-commissioned status as USNS LST-546 until 15 July 1972.

Transfer to the Philippines
On 15 July 1972, LST-546 was taken out of service and transferred under lease to the Republic of the Philippines. The Philippines purchased her outright in 1980. In the Philippine Navy, she served as BRP ''Surigao del Sur. Her final disposition is unknown.

References

External links 
  history.navy.mil: USS LST-546
  navsource.org: USS LST-546

LST-542-class tank landing ships
World War II amphibious warfare vessels of the United States
Cold War amphibious warfare vessels of the United States
Ships transferred from the United States Navy to the Philippine Navy
Ships built in Evansville, Indiana
1944 ships